Eugeniu Botez (28 November 1874 – 12 May 1933) was a Romanian writer, best known for his novel Europolis (1933). Botez wrote under the pseudonym Jean Bart.

He was born , at the time a village in Botoșani County, now a neighborhood of the city of Suceava. His father, Panait Botez, was a general in the Romanian Army; his mother was Smaranda (née Nastasachi) and his brother was Octav Botez. At age 4 he moved with his family to Iași; in elementary school he had as teacher Ion Creangă. After attending the military high school in Iași from 1889 to 1894, he went to Bucharest, where he graduated from the Officers School in 1896 with the rank of second lieutenant.

Botez had three children: Călin-Adam (born in 1909), Stroe-Eugen (1912) and Ada (1918). The boys were from his first marriage with Marioara Dumitrescu (who died in 1913), and Ada from his second marriage with Mania Goldman (which ended in divorce in 1926). Mania retained her husband's name, becoming known as the pianist Manya Botez.

He was elected a corresponding member of the Romanian Academy in 1922. He died in Bucharest in 1933.

Works
 Jurnal de bord, 1901
 Datorii uitate, 1916
 În cușca leului, 1916
 Prințesa Bibița, 1923
 În Deltă..., 1925
 Peste Ocean - Note dintr-o călătorie în America de Nord, 1926
 Schițe marine din lumea porturilor, 1928
 Însemnări și amintiri, 1928
 O corabie românească. Nava-școală bricul "Mircea", 1931
 Pe drumuri de apă, 1931
 Europolis, 1933

Notes

See also
Literature of Romania

1874 births
1933 deaths
People from Suceava
Romanian novelists
Romanian male novelists
Corresponding members of the Romanian Academy
20th-century pseudonymous writers